Mafyeko is an administrative ward in the Chunya district of the Mbeya Region of Tanzania. In 2016 the Tanzania National Bureau of Statistics report there were 10,370 people in the ward, from 9,409 in 2012.

Villages / vitongoji 
The ward has 2 villages and 10 vitongoji.

 Bitimanyanga
 Bitimanyanga A
 Bitimanyanga B
 Bitimanyanga C
 Bitimanyanga D
 Idodoma
 Mafyeko
 Mafyeko A
 Mafyeko B
 Mafyeko C
 Mafyeko D
 Tulieni

References 

Wards of Mbeya Region